Guillaume Stéphan (born 10 September 1982) is a French former professional footballer. A midfielder, he spent two seasons with Tours FC in Ligue 2 and Championnat National after playing for the reserves of Ligue 1 sides En Avant de Guingamp (2003 to 2004) and Paris Saint-Germain (2002 to 2003).

Personal life
Gullaume Stéphan is the brother of Julien Stéphan and the son of Guy Stéphan, both also former footballers.

Honours
Tours
 Championnat National: 2005–06

References

External links
 
 

1982 births
Living people
Footballers from Le Havre
Association football midfielders
French footballers
Paris Saint-Germain F.C. players
En Avant Guingamp players
FC Meyrin players
Tours FC players
French people of Breton descent